James Calvin Withrow (July 4, 1945 – July 3, 2011) is a former center in the National Football League who played for the San Diego Chargers, Green Bay Packers and the St. Louis Cardinals.  Withrow played collegiate ball for the University of Kentucky before playing professionally in the NFL for 5 seasons and retired in 1974. Cal died one day before his 66th birthday.

References

2011 deaths
1945 births
People from Portsmouth, Ohio
Players of American football from Ohio
American football centers
Green Bay Packers players
Kentucky Wildcats football players
San Diego Chargers players